Abraham Henry Foxman (born May 1, 1940) is an American lawyer and activist. He served as the national director of the Anti-Defamation League from 1987 to 2015, and is currently the League's national director emeritus. From 2016 to 2021 he served as vice chair of the board of trustees at the Museum of Jewish Heritage in New York City in order to lead its efforts on antisemitism.

Early life

Foxman, an only son, was born in Baranovichi, just months after the Soviet Union took the town from Poland in the Molotov–Ribbentrop Pact and incorporated it into the Byelorussian Soviet Socialist Republic. The town is now in Belarus. Foxman's parents were Polish Jewish, Helen and Joseph Foxman.

Foxman's parents left him with his Polish Catholic nanny, Bronisława Kurpi, when they were ordered by the Germans to enter a ghetto in 1941. Foxman was baptized into Christianity by the Catholic Church, given the Polish Christian name of Henryk Stanisław Kurpi, and raised as a Catholic in Vilnius until he was returned to his parents in 1944.

Education and career

Foxman immigrated to the United States in 1950 with his parents. He graduated from the Yeshivah of Flatbush in Brooklyn, New York City. He earned a Bachelor of Arts degree in political science from the City College of New York and graduated with honors in history. Foxman also holds a J.D. degree from the New York University School of Law. He did graduate work in Jewish studies at the Jewish Theological Seminary of America and in international economics at The New School.

ADL legal representative Arnold Forster hired Foxman in 1965 as a legal assistant in the ADL's international affairs division. In 1987, Foxman was the consensus choice of the Board to become its new National Director, replacing long-time director Nathan Perlmutter.

Recognition

Foxman has been awarded several honors from nonprofit groups, religious figures, and statesmen. In 1998, Foxman received the Interfaith Committee of Remembrance Lifetime Achievement Award "as a leader in the fight against anti-Semitism, bigotry, and discrimination". Foxman won the Raoul Wallenberg Humanitarian Leadership Award on April 18, 2002, from the Center for Holocaust and Genocide Studies at  Ramapo College of New Jersey.

On October 16, 2006, Foxman was awarded as Knight of the Legion of Honor by Jacques Chirac, the President of France at the time. This award is France's highest civilian honor.

On a May 22, 2008, ceremony, Foxman was awarded an honorary doctoral degree from Yeshiva University by Richard Joel, the presiding president of Yeshiva University.

Additionally, President George W. Bush appointed Foxman to serve on the Honorary Delegation to accompany him to Jerusalem for the celebration of the 60th anniversary of Israel in May 2008.

Political stances

Support for gay rights

Foxman's support for gay rights in America placed him at odds with many Orthodox Jews. Concerning the former, which involved his protest in 2000-2001 of a case (Boy Scouts of America v. Dale) in which "the Supreme Court ruled that the Boy Scouts of America could exclude a gay scoutmaster because of his sexual orientation", it was reported that, "For many Jewish groups that work with the Boy Scouts – mainly Reform temples and Jewish community centers – the ensuing year has been marked by soul-searching, as they grappled with whether they should end their ties to the organization because of the organization's stance on gays", and that, "Within the Jewish community, Orthodox groups supported the ruling, saying civic organizations should be empowered to determine their own message - but most Jewish organizations condemned it as endorsing discrimination." According to that report published a year later, in 2001, "the Anti-Defamation League's national director, Abraham Foxman, and its national chairman, Howard Berkowitz, said in a statement at the time: "We are stunned that in the year 2000, the Supreme Court could issue such a decision. ... This decision effectively states that as long as an organization avows an anti-homosexual position, it is free to discriminate against gay and lesbian Americans."

Criticism of Mel Gibson

Foxman has received criticism from Jewish and non-Jewish quarters for his antagonist approach to the 2004 film The Passion of the Christ and its director, Mel Gibson. In September 2003, during the pre-release controversy, Foxman called Gibson "the portrait of an anti-Semite". The next day he said, "I'm not ready to say he's an anti-Semite", but that Gibson "entertains views that can only be described as anti-Semitic". In November 2003, Foxman said of Gibson, "I think he's infected, seriously infected, with some very, very serious anti-Semitic views." Foxman was also criticized for his initial response to Gibson's apology for his behavior during his 2006 DUI arrest, and for giving second billing to the Seattle Jewish Federation shooting that occurred on the same day. Foxman accepted Gibson's second apology, although he continued to censure Gibson publicly, saying in 2008, "In his heyday, he was No. 1 in Hollywood, the most sought-after star, the people's choice, the icon. Then he revealed himself as an anti-Semite, and look where he is today. That's the beauty of America."
Foxman continued to condemn Gibson for The Passion of the Christ, saying in 2008, "What he was doing was giving credibility, on film, in our lifetime, to deicide. Where is Mel Gibson today? He did his movie, and one day, he revealed himself to the American people. He's no icon anymore."

Opposition to a Congress resolution recognizing the Armenian genocide

In July 2007, Foxman's opposition to a congressional resolution recognizing the Armenian genocide drew much criticism. "I don't think congressional action will help reconcile the issue. The resolution takes a position; it comes to a judgement", said Foxman in a statement issued to the Jewish Telegraphic Agency. "The Turks and Armenians need to revisit their past. The Jewish community shouldn't be the arbiter of that history, nor should the U.S. Congress." Sharistan Melkonian, chairwoman of the Armenian National Committee of Eastern Massachusetts, accused Foxman of engaging in "genocide denial" in an interview with The Boston Globe. Various New England communities threatened to sever ties with the ADL-sponsored "No Place for Hate" program in response. In August 2007, Foxman publicly affirmed the position of the Anti-Defamation League, "that the consequences of [the Ottoman government's] actions were indeed tantamount to genocide", but that a United States Congressional recognition of this history was unnecessary, and not helpful. He went on to state, "We continue to firmly believe that a Congressional Resolution on such matters is a counterproductive diversion and will not foster reconciliation between Turks and Armenians. We will not hesitate to apply the term 'genocide' in the future." Foxman additionally sent a letter to Turkish Prime Minister Recep Tayyip Erdogan expressing regret over the difficulty his position caused for the government of Turkey: "We had no intention to put the Turkish people or its leaders in a difficult position."

Opposition to Park51

Several critics have spoken against Foxman's opposition to the Park51 Islamic community center near the World Trade Center site, citing hypocrisy, since ADL's mission statement says it seeks "to put an end forever to unjust and unfair discrimination against and ridicule of any sect or body of citizens". Fareed Zakaria, a recipient of ADL's Hubert H. Humphrey First Amendment Freedoms Prize, has returned the prize and its $10,000 honorarium, saying that he "cannot in good conscience hold onto the award or the honorarium that came with it". Zakaria has "urged the ADL to reverse its decision".

Books

The Deadliest Lies: The Israel Lobby and the Myth of Jewish Control, Palgrave MacMillan, 
Jews and Money: The Story of a Stereotype, Palgrave Macmillan, 2010 
A Nation of Immigrants, John F. Kennedy (Foreword), Harper Perennial, 
Never Again? The Threat of the New Anti-Semitism, Harper Collins, 2003, 
Viral Hate: Containing Its Spread on the Internet, written with Christopher Wolf, Palgrave Macmillan, 2013

Films

 Defamation (2009): Filmmaker Yoav Shamir profiles Anti-Defamation League director Abraham Foxman in this documentary about anti-Semitism.

References

External links

1940 births
Living people
Activists against antisemitism
Jewish American community activists
American people of Belarusian-Jewish descent
American people of Polish-Jewish descent
Anti-Defamation League members
Belarusian Jews
Chevaliers of the Légion d'honneur
City College of New York faculty
General and operations managers
Holocaust survivors
Jewish American attorneys
Jewish Theological Seminary of America alumni
New York University School of Law alumni
People from Baranavichy
Soviet emigrants to the United States
Activists from New York (state)
21st-century American Jews